Sandsfoot Castle Halt was a small railway station on the Portland Branch Railway between Weymouth and Portland in Dorset.

Station
Opened on 1 August 1932, it was part of a scheme that saw several halts to counter road competition. Services were provided by railmotors, carriages equipped with driving ends and their own small steam engine. The station closed with the branch in 1952.

Site today
The remains of the timber platform are located on the Rodwell Trail, a popular local walk.

References

Notes

External links
 Sandsfoot Castle station on navigable 1945 O. S. map

Disused railway stations in Dorset
Former Weymouth and Portland Railway stations
Railway stations in Great Britain opened in 1932
Railway stations in Great Britain closed in 1952